The 132nd Indiana Infantry Regiment served in the Union Army between May 18 and September 7, 1864, during the American Civil War.

Service 
The regiment was organized at Indianapolis, Indiana and mustered in on May 18, 1864. Once mustered in, it was ordered to Tennessee on May 18, and assigned to duty guarding the railroad at both Stevenson, Alabama, till July and at Nashville, Tennessee, till early September. The regiment was mustered out on September 7, 1864. During its service the regiment lost twelve men to disease.

See also
 List of Indiana Civil War regiments

References

Bibliography 
 Dyer, Frederick H. (1959). A Compendium of the War of the Rebellion. New York and London. Thomas Yoseloff, Publisher. .

Units and formations of the Union Army from Indiana
Military units and formations established in 1864
1864 establishments in Indiana
Military units and formations disestablished in 1864
1864 disestablishments in Indiana